Statistics of Superettan in season 2004.

Overview
It was contested by 16 teams, and BK Häcken won the championship.

League table

Season statistics

Top scorers

Top assists

Top goalkeepers
(Minimum of 10 games played)

Footnotes

References
Sweden - List of final tables (Clas Glenning)

Superettan seasons
2
Sweden
Sweden